Strömstedt is a Swedish surname. Notable people with the surname include:

Anna Karin Strömstedt (born 1981), Swedish cross-country skier and biathlete
Jenny Strömstedt (born 1972), Swedish television host and journalist
Lasse Strömstedt (1935–2009), Swedish writer
Niklas Strömstedt (born 1958), Swedish singer and songwriter
Ulla Strömstedt (1939–1986), Swedish actress

Swedish-language surnames